Søren Fredrik Voie (born 20 March 1949, in Vestvågøy) is a Norwegian politician for the Conservative Party of Norway.

He was elected to the Norwegian Parliament from Nordland in 2001, but was not re-elected in 2005. He served in the position of deputy representative during the terms 1997–2001 and 2005–2009.

On the local level Voie was a member of the executive committee of Vestvågøy municipality council during the term 1979–1983, and then served as mayor from 1983 to 1987. From 1987 to 1995 he was also involved in Nordland county council. He was a member of the Conservative Party central committee from 1998 to 2002.

Outside politics Voie has had a diverse career. He started in the fishing industry, before being a high school teacher from 1976 to 1983, bank director in Sparebank1 Nord-Norge from 1988 to 1992, administrative chief officer (rådmann in Vestvågøy from 1992 to 1999 and director at the Nord-Trøndelag University College from 1999 to 2001.

References

1949 births
Living people
Members of the Storting
Mayors of places in Nordland
Conservative Party (Norway) politicians
21st-century Norwegian politicians
People from Vestvågøy